The Einhard Prize (German: Einhard-Preis) is a literary prize for historical biography. It is awarded by the Einhard-Stiftung, a foundation headquartered in Seligenstadt, Hesse, Germany, a town founded by Einhard, famous as a biographer of Charlemagne.

Prizes awarded
 1999: Otto Pflanze, works about  Otto von Bismarck
 2001: Brian Boyd, biography of  Vladimir Nabokov
 2003: Joachim C. Fest, works about Albert Speer
 2005: Irène Heidelberger-Leonard, Revolte in der Resignation, a biography of  Jean Améry
 2007: Eberhard Weis, biography of Maximilian von Montgelas
 2009: Margot Friedländer, autobiography Versuche, Dein Leben zu machen
 2011: Hugh Barr Nisbet, biography of  Gotthold Ephraim Lessing
 2013: John C. G. Röhl, biography of Wilhelm II, German Emperor
 2015: Joachim Radkau, biography of Theodor Heuss
 2017: Albrecht Schöne, Der Briefschreiber Goethe
 2019: Emmanuelle Loyer, biography of Claude Lévi-Strauss
 2021: Jacques Tardi, graphic novel biography of his father, World War II veteran René Tardi

References
Website of the Einhard Prize Foundation (German only) https://www.einhard-stiftung.de/

Literary awards of Hesse